Datuk Wira Soh Chin Ann  (or Soh Chin Aun due to misspelling by Malaysian media; ; born 28 July 1950) is a Malaysian former footballer. He was affectionately known as Tauke or Towkay by his teammates and fans. RSSSF and IFFHS recognised Soh as the player with the most international caps in men's football with 219 caps. He formerly held the record of all-time most appearances in FIFA international recognized matches with 195 caps, before being overtaken by Kuwait's Bader Al-Mutawa in 2022.

Club career
Soh started his football career with Malacca in 1969. He joined Selangor in 1971 and played for them until 1978 winning six Malaysia Cup titles. He returned to star for Malacca in 1979 and won the League Cup title in 1983 but was inactive for two years due to a one-year suspension in 1985. He captained Malacca  in 1988 which was also his last appearances in the domestic league.

International career

National team
At the age of 19, Soh earned his full international caps for Malaysia at the 1969 King's Cup. In 1971, when he played in the Olympic qualifier in Seoul, South Korea, he was the youngest member of the national team at the age of 21. He participated in the 1972 Munich Olympic Games and playing all three group games. He also was the captain of the team that qualified for the 1980 Moscow Olympic Games. Unfortunately, Malaysia did not participate in boycott of the Soviet invasion of Afghanistan. However, because of his contribution for helping Malaysia to qualify for the Olympics, he was awarded the Ahli Mangku Negara by the Yang di-Pertuan Agong. He later took part in the 1980 AFC Asian Cup, where his Malaysia was eliminated from the group stage, yet Malaysia produced one of the finest performance ever under his leadership, with the team gaining a famous 1–1 draw over powerhouse South Korea; Soh gained fame as well for having an exceptional tournament, allowing him to be named into the Team of the Tournament by the AFC, the first Southeast Asian to receive such honour, a record which would stand until the 2019 AFC Asian Cup.

Malaysia Selection
On 11 May 1975, Soh is part of the Malaysia Selection that played against Arsenal FC in a friendly match which his team won by 2-0 at Merdeka Stadium.

Retirement
He retired from international football in 1984 and made 252 international appearances as recorded by Football Association of Malaysia. Asian Football Confederation recognised his achievements and included him into AFC Century Club in February 1999.

Post-playing career 
He was appointed as the chairman of the referees' committee on 13 March 2007. He was the team manager (not head coach) of Malaysia national football team from 2007 until 2009.

Political career 
He once tried to make it in politics by contesting to be the Member of Parliament for Kota Melaka representing Malaysian Chinese Association (MCA) of Barisan Nasional (BN) in 1986 but he suffered a defeat of 17,606 votes to Lim Guan Eng of Democratic Action Party (DAP).

Election results

Personal life
In 2016, he made a cameo appearance in Ola Bola as Chow Kok Keong, a character based on himself in the 1980 Moscow Olympics qualification campaign.

Career statistics

International

''Scores and results list Malaysia's goal tally first, score column indicates score after each Ann goal.

Honours
Selangor
 Malaysia Cup: 1971, 1972, 1973, 1975, 1976, 1978

Malacca
 Malaysian League: 1983

Malaysia
 Asian Games Bronze Medal: 1974
 SEA Games: 1977, 1979
 Pestabola Merdeka: 1973, 1974, 1976, 1979
 King's Cup: 1972, 1976, 1978
 Jakarta Anniversary Tournament: 1970

Individual
 All-Star Team AFC Asian Cup: 1980
 AFC Asian All Stars: 1982
 AFC Century Club: 1999
 OCM Hall of Fame: 2004
 Asian Football Hall of Fame: 2014
 Goal.com The best Malaysia XI of all time: 2020
 IFFHS Men’s All Time Malaysia Dream Team: 2022 

Records
 Malaysia national football team  all-time most appearances: 219
 The first men's footballers to reach 200 or more international caps: 219
20th century most international caps in men's football (1901–2000): 219
 The first Asian footballers to reach 100 or more international wins for national team: 108
 The first footballers to reach 100 or more international wins for national team (1969–1984): 108

Order
  :
  Member of the Order of the Defender of the Realm (AMN) (1980)
  :
  Knight Companion of the Order of the Crown of Pahang (DIMP) – Dato' (2000)
  :
  Knight Companion of the Order of Sultan Sharafuddin Idris Shah (DSIS) – Dato' (2016)
  :
 Knight Commander of the Exalted Order of Malacca (DCSM) – Datuk Wira (2021)

See also
List of men's footballers with 100 or more international caps
List of progression men's association football caps record

References

External links
 Malaysian torchbearers of the Olympic Flame
 Profile Page at Selangorfc.com 

1950 births
Living people
People from Malacca
Malaysian sportspeople of Chinese descent
Malaysian footballers
Malaysia international footballers
Olympic footballers of Malaysia
Footballers at the 1972 Summer Olympics
1980 AFC Asian Cup players
Malacca FA players
Selangor FA players
Members of the Order of the Defender of the Realm
Malaysian sportsperson-politicians
Malaysian Chinese Association politicians
Asian Games bronze medalists for Malaysia
Asian Games medalists in football
Southeast Asian Games gold medalists for Malaysia
Southeast Asian Games medalists in football
Southeast Asian Games bronze medalists for Malaysia
Association football defenders
Footballers at the 1974 Asian Games
Medalists at the 1974 Asian Games
Competitors at the 1973 Southeast Asian Peninsular Games
FIFA Century Club
Malaysian political candidates